The Order of Military Merit, which was initially known as the Institution of Military Merit, was a French military order that was created on 10 March 1759 by King Louis XV for non-Catholic military officers who had assisted the French state.

History
There were by the 18th Century regiments of Swedish, German, and Swiss troops in service to France, the most famous of which were the Swiss Guards.  Since many of these regiments' officers were Protestant, they were ineligible for conferral with Roman Catholic orders of chivalry such as the Order of Saint Louis. King Louis XV initially created the Institution du Mérite militaire as an award, but not as an order, because French orders were exclusive Catholics.  The three classes of the Institution du Mérite militaire, which were decreed in 1785, were Knight, Commander or Gran Cordon and Grand Cross, the latter limited to four and two receivers, respectively. King Louis was careful to promote the prestige of the award by appointing the most talented officers. One of the first Grand Crosses was received by William Henry, Prince of Nassau-Saarbrücken. In 1791, during the French Revolution, the Order of Military Merit was incorporated into the Order of St. Louis to create a single Décoration Militaire, to which King Louis XVIII of France made appointments until he on 28 November 1814 reinstituted the Order of Military Merit, and increased the number of available Grand Crosses to four and the number of available Grand Cordons to eight, and changed the colour of their sash to that of the Order of St. Louis.

Decoration

Knight
Commander
Grand Cross

Notable recipients
 John Paul Jones
 Johann de Kalb
 Axel von Fersen
 Curt von Stedingk
 Władysław Grzegorz Branicki
 Charles-Daniel de Meuron
Sir James Leith (Knight Grand Cordon)
 Thomas Moody (1779 - 1849) (Knight)
Richard Clement Moody (Knight Grand Cross)

References

Military Merit
Military Merit